The Battle of Hubat was fought between the forces of Hubat principality led by Emir of Adal Ahmad ibn Ibrahim al-Ghazi, 
and the Abyssinian army, under Degelhan. This was the first encounter between Ahmed's forces with Abyssinians. Ahmed was known as Emir during this battle as he was yet to be given the title Imam.

Upon hearing that a rebel named Ahmed Ibrahim was in a power struggle with the Adal leaders, the Emperor of Ethiopia Dawit II sent his general Degelhan to 
confront him. The Abyssinian campaign originally seemed successful as large amounts of women and children of Adal were captured by Degelhan including
the mother of Ahmed's commander Abubaker Qecchin. Meanwhile Emir Ahmed had laid a trap in Hubat, splitting his unit into three, he waited for the Abyssinians to enter the region after sacking Harar and ambushed them. The remaining Abyssinian army who were not killed fled in panic, thus Ahmed's troops won decisively and were able to recover stolen booty.

References

Adal Sultanate
16th-century conflicts
Wars involving the states and peoples of Africa